Saidiyeh (also Romanized as Sa‘īdīyeh) is a village in Ordughesh Rural District, Zeberkhan District, Nishapur County, Razavi Khorasan Province, Iran. At the 2006 census, its population was 557, in 152 families.

References 

Populated places in Nishapur County